"Leider/Vergissmeinnicht" (Regrettably/Forget-me-not) is a US limited edition double single from the German industrial metal band Eisbrecher, from their album Antikörper. It combines all the tracks from Leider and Vergissmeinnicht, as well as two videos.

Track listing 
 Leider (Radio Cut) - 4:07
 Vergissmeinnicht (Radio Mix) - 3:52
 Leider (The Retrosic Mix) - 4:57
 Wie Tief? (How Deep?) - 4:23
 Vergissmeinnicht (Vergissmeinmix Mix) - 4:29
 Leider (Noel Pix Klingenklang Mix) - 4:37
 Vergissmeinnicht (Phase III Mix) - 5:32
 Willkommen Im Nichts (Multimediatrack) - 4:34
 Schwarze Witwe (Making of) (Multimediatrack) - 3:52

2006 singles